iAero Airways, previously Swift Air, is an American airline based in Greensboro, North Carolina, United States. It operates charter flights for nationally known fractional aircraft operators, financial institutions, construction, transportation, many collegiate athletic departments, professional sports organizations, and major tour operators. It is also a major contractor for U.S. Immigration and Customs Enforcement, operating many of the agency's deportation flights as well as flights transporting detainees between immigration detention facilities within the United States. The airline also provides aircraft management services for private owners. Its main hub is Miami International Airport.

Following the acquisition of assets from the second Eastern Air Lines in 2017, Swift Air began operating charter flights to Cuba for Havana Air.

History

The airline was established in 1997 and was a customer for the Embraer ERJ-135. In November 2006, the airline received authorization for Part 121 operations and began flying three Boeing 737-400s. These aircraft are each configured with all first class interiors, electrical outlets, and club work areas with tables. The primary use of these aircraft is air transportation for major professional sports team (NBA, NHL, MLB) and for VIP charters.

John McCain's 2008 presidential campaign utilized one of Swift Air's Boeing 737-400s, which was dubbed the Straight Talk Express, the same name given to his bus used earlier in the campaign.

In June 2011, Swift Air originally planned to operate public charter flights from Chicago to some European destinations such as Belgrade, Zagreb and Kraków; however, these destinations were only flown in June 2011.

On June 17, 2011, Swift Air voluntarily suspended their Part 121 operations pending an inquiry by the FAA. Swift Air resumed normal part 121 operations on June 25, 2011 after making manual changes to satisfy the FAA.

In 2017, Swift Air announced plans to acquire the Boeing 737-800 assets of the second iteration of Eastern Air Lines stating, "Eastern Air Lines’ name, assets, and associated trademarks will be retained within the transaction.". One aircraft remains painted in Eastern livery to protect the trademark, although the fleet of Dynamic Airways (owned by a co-owner of Swift Air) would eventually take the Eastern name and trademark (as Eastern Airlines, without the space), retaining the Dynamic AOC.

In May 2019, Swift became a subsidiary of iAero Group, an aviation service firm minority owned by The Blackstone Group.

As of December 2019, Swift Air began its transition to rebrand as iAero Airways.

Rebranding
Swift Air has announced that it intends to rebrand itself as iAero Airways, following its recent takeover by the iAero Group. A filing with the US Department of Transportation (DOT) on September 9, 2019, stated that at present time, it intends to retain its corporate name - Swift Air, LLC - and therefore does not seek the re-issuance of its operating licenses and certificates.

Fleet

Current

As of October 2022, the iAero Airways fleet includes:

Former
As Swift Air, it consisted of the following fleet:

See also
List of airlines of the United States

References

External links
 

1997 establishments in Arizona
Airlines based in Florida
Airlines established in 1997
American companies established in 1997
Charter airlines of the United States
Companies based in Miami